Airline Captain Aluel James Bol, is a professional pilot in the United States of America, who flies for Delta Air Lines. She is credited to be the first woman from South Sudan to qualify as an airline pilot.

Early life and education
She was born circa 1984 to South Sudanese parents. Her father was the late Justice James Bol. She grew up in Kenya, as a refugee, during South Sudan's political and ethnic conflict. Following the death of her father, she was sponsored by the new South Sudanese government to complete training as an airline pilot, in aviation schools in the United States, graduating in 2011.

Career
Following her graduation in 2011, Aluel worked for Ethiopian Airlines. She then took up a consulting role with the South Sudanese Ministry of Transport and Roads. Later, she flew for the low-cost carrier flydubai, a subsidiary of Emirates Airlines. In 2018, she made Captain with Delta Air Lines, a major American airline company, headquartered in Atlanta, Georgia.

See also
 Juba International Airport
 List of airports in South Sudan

References

External links
 Meet South Sudan's second female pilot who studied in Kenya As of 14 August 2018.

1984 births
Living people
Women aviators
People from Lakes (state)
South Sudanese aviators
Commercial aviators
Women commercial aviators